Michael David Sonye (born April 22, 1954), best known by his stage and screen name Dukey Flyswatter, is an American actor, screenwriter, and musician, recognized for his work on numerous low-budget B movies and as singer for the Los Angeles horror punk band Haunted Garage.

Career

Film
Flyswatter first began acting as a teenager in community theatre, where at one point he received improvisation lessons from Del Close. His earliest screen credit came in 1975, when he worked as a script doctor on a draft of the screenplay for the horror film Frozen Scream, which was famously listed as one of the original "video nasties"; though the film was not banned outright, it still remains unreleased in the United Kingdom. Nearly a decade later, Flyswatter struck up a partnership with prolific low-budget director Fred Olen Ray. With Ray, Flyswatter penned the screenplays for his films Prison Ship and Commando Squad, both of which he acted in, and appeared in minor roles in films including The Tomb, Cyclone and Hollywood Chainsaw Hookers.

In 1987, Flyswatter wrote the screenplay for the campy horror comedy Blood Diner. A loose remake of the 1963 Herschell Gordon Lewis film Blood Feast, Blood Diner has since been dubbed a "cult classic" by horror fans and websites such as Dread Central, HorrorNews.net and GeekNation. The same year, he appeared in a co-starring role as the villainous Mengele in the infamous Troma-produced Surf Nazis Must Die, itself also considered a "cult classic", albeit as one of the worst movies ever made. In 1988, Flyswatter provided the voice of Uncle Impie, the primary puppet antagonist of David DeCoteaus Sorority Babes in the Slimeball Bowl-O-Rama.

Since the 1990s, Flyswatter has mostly played cameos in smaller-budgeted independent horror films, though also appeared in a string of adult films playing comedic non-sex roles such as "The Clit Master" in the Extreme Associates film Terrors from the Clit and "P. T. Bone 'Em" in the superhero parody Super Quick 2, the latter of which earned him a nomination for "Best Non-Sex Performance – Film or Video" at the 2002 AVN Awards. In 2004, Flyswatter had a major role playing fetish filmmaker Irving Klaw in the Bettie Page biopic Bettie Page: Dark Angel.

Music

In 1985, Flyswatter formed the horror punk/heavy metal band Haunted Garage in Los Angeles, where he filled the role of lyricist and lead singer at the behest of the band's bassist – as he recalled in a 2013 interview, "I hadn't done any singing, except [while] being drunk". It was during the formation of the band that he created his Dukey Flyswatter nickname and stage persona. Wanting to be an "Isaac Hayes/Escape from N.Y./Duke of LA-type character", he adopted the name "Dukey", while "Flyswatter" was suggested by a bandmate. As he said in a 2012 interview, "Michael Sonye was gone and Dukey Flyswatter stayed...Michael Sonye was the reserved one and Dukey Flyswatter was the persona, the artist, and he was really out there".

Noted for their bloody and prop-filled live shows, irreverent B movie-inspired lyrics and Flyswatter's manic shock rock stage antics, Haunted Garage became a prominent fixture in the Los Angeles underground throughout the late 1980s and early 1990s, recording music for and appearing onscreen in several low-budget horror films including Cyclone and Nightmare Sisters before eventually signing to Metal Blade Records to release their sole LP Possession Park in 1991. Following their disbandment in 1993, Flyswatter sang in several other groups including the cross-dressing riot grrrrl parody band Fox Twat, the Dead Kennedys tribute Hemorrhoid in Cambodia and the Dead Boys tribute Moronic Reducer, the latter of which was showcased in the 2001 tribute band documentary Tributary: A Study of an American Pop Culture Subculture. During the 2010s, Flyswatter fronted another Dead Kennedys tribute band, the zombie-themed Undead Kennedys, which, in 2015, was ranked 14th on LA Weeklys list of the top 20 tribute bands in Los Angeles.

After a series of one-off reunion shows spanning from 1995 to 2008, Haunted Garage re-formed in 2013 with an all new line-up, featuring Flyswatter as the only original member. In 2016, with producer Paul Roessler, the band released the EP Slenderman and Other Strange Tales, their first studio release in twenty five years. The EP was re-issued on vinyl in 2020, featuring two newly-recorded tracks.

Other endeavors
In 1991, Flyswatter made a cameo appearance in the music video for Green Jellÿs "The Misadventures of Shitman", which was later released on their video tape Cereal Killer. In 1992, he appeared with Haunted Garage on The Montel Williams Show alongside Sean Brennan of London After Midnight in a special about gothic rock and the vampire subculture. Flyswatter's eyeball is featured as the cover of Transmissions from Planet Awesome, a 1998 album by punk rock band ADZ, a side project of Adolescents singer Tony Cadena. ADZ additionally recorded a song called "Flyswatter" in tribute to him which appeared on the 1999 compilation Odz 'n' Sodz.

Flyswatter has also appeared in numerous projects by the comedy punk band the Radioactive Chicken Heads, including a cameo appearance in their 2013 music video "Atom the Amazing Zombie Killer" and portraying Elvis Presley in their 2015 stage play The Radioactive Chicken Heads Tanksgiving Special at The Steve Allen Theater. For the release of the band's 2017 concept album Tales From The Coop, Flyswatter played the role of the narrative's antagonist Dr. Baron von Kluckinstein, contributing vocals to the album and playing the character in the Chicken Heads' accompanying television pilot The Radioactive Chicken Heads Show.

Flyswatter is an avid fan and collector of vintage horror and exploitation cinema, and served as a creative consultant on Fred Olen Ray's 1985 Sleazemania!, a video compilation of exploitation trailers from the 1930s through the 1960s. He has written articles about horror and Halloween-related media and events for The Los Angeles Beat, and has also written several unproduced scripts and projects.

At one point, a nude portrait of Flyswatter as the god Pan painted by lowbrow artist Stacy Lande was hung in the home of Clive Barker.

In late 2018, it was announced that Flyswatter would receive brain surgery to remove a tumor near his visual cortex, for which Haunted Garage performed a benefit show nine days prior to his surgery. As detailed on the band's social media, the tumor was successfully removed and declared benign, and Flyswatter returned to performing live with Haunted Garage just six months later with a show in Los Angeles on May 18, 2019.

Filmography

As actor

As screenwriter

As composer
All with Haunted Garage.

Discography
See Haunted Garage#Discography

References

External links

Haunted Garage on Facebook
Undead Kennedys on Facebook

1954 births
20th-century American male actors
American heavy metal singers
American male film actors
American punk rock singers
Horror punk musicians
American male screenwriters
Jewish American screenwriters
Male actors from Los Angeles
Living people
Screenwriters from California
21st-century American Jews